Lokia coryndoni is a species of dragonfly in the family Libellulidae. It is endemic to Uganda.  Its natural habitat is subtropical or tropical moist lowland forests. It is threatened by habitat loss.

Sources 

Libellulidae
Odonata of Africa
Endemic fauna of Uganda
Insects of Uganda
Least concern biota of Africa
Insects described in 1953
Taxa named by Frederic Charles Fraser
Taxonomy articles created by Polbot
Taxobox binomials not recognized by IUCN